YZ Canis Minoris is a red-hued star in the equatorial constellation of Canis Minor. With an apparent visual magnitude of 11.15, it is much too faint to be viewed with the naked eye. Presently the star is moving further away with a heliocentric radial velocity of +26.5 km/s. YZ CMi is a potential member of the Beta Pictoris moving group.

This is a red dwarf star, or M-type main-sequence star, with a stellar classification of M5 V. It is a flare star, so called due to its stellar flares being more powerful than those of Earth's star, and is roughly three times the size of Jupiter. The radio emission from the star is in a 50 mHz bandwidth and is centered on 1464.9 mHz.

References

M-type main-sequence stars
Flare stars
Canis Minor
J07444018+0333089
0285
037766
Canis Minoris, YZ